Nasirai (also Romanized as Naşīrā’ī and Nasīrā’ī) is a village in Howmeh Rural District, in the Central District of Minab County, Hormozgan Province, Iran. At the 2006 census, its population was 1,355, in 270 families.

References 

Populated places in Minab County